1,2-Bis(dimethylarsino)benzene (diars) is the organoarsenic compound with the formula CH(As(CH)). The molecule consists of two dimethylarsino groups attached to adjacent carbon centers of a benzene ring. It is a chelating ligand in coordination chemistry. This colourless oil is commonly abbreviated "diars."

Coordination chemistry
Related, but non-chelating organoarsenic ligands include triphenylarsine and trimethylarsine. Work on diars preceded the development of the chelating diphosphine ligands such as dppe, which are now prevalent in homogeneous catalysis.

Diars is a bidentate ligand used in coordination chemistry. It was first described in 1939, but was popularized by R. S. Nyholm for its ability to stabilize metal complexes with unusual oxidation states and coordination numbers, e.g. TiCl(diars). High coordination numbers arise because diars is fairly compact and the As-M bonds are long, which relieves crowding at the metal center.  In terms of stabilizing unusual oxidation states, diars stabilizes Ni(III), as in [NiCl(diars)]Cl.

Of historical interest is the supposedly diamagnetic [Ni(diars)](ClO), obtained by heating nickel perchlorate with diars.  Octahedral d complexes characteristically have triplet ground states, so the diamagnetism of this complex was puzzling.  Later by X-ray crystallography, the complex was shown to be pentacoordinate with the formula [Ni(triars)(diars)](ClO), where triars is the tridentate ligand [CHAs(CH)]As(CH), arising from the elimination of trimethylarsine.

Preparation and handling
Diars is prepared by the reaction of ortho-dichlorobenzene and sodium dimethylarsenide:
CHCl + 2 NaAs(CH) → CH(As(CH)) + 2 NaCl
It is a colorless liquid. Oxygen converts diars to the dioxide, CH(As(CH)O).

References 

Benzene derivatives
Chelating agents
Cacodyl compounds